The 2004 Hull City Council election took place on 10 June 2004 to elect members of Hull City Council in England. One third of the council was up for election and the council stayed under no overall control.

After the election, the composition of the council was
Labour 27
Liberal Democrat 24
Independent 5
Conservative 2
United Kingdom Independence Party 1

Campaign
Before the election the Labour party formed the administration after becoming the largest party in the 2003 election. Their administration however was criticised by the Audit Commission, which raised the hopes of the Liberal Democrats that could regain control of the council.

Labour campaigned saying that voters should choose "order and progress" under themselves rather than the chaos they said the Liberal Democrats had brought while they were in office. They hoped to expand their pilot programme of free school meals for all children to all schools within the city. The Liberal Democrats however wanted to abolish the programme and pledged to establish crime prevention funds for neighbourhoods, free off-peak bus travel for pensioners and expand recycling. The Liberal Democrats also pledged to keep council tax increases to the same level as rises in earnings for the 2 years after the election.

20 of the 59 seats on the council were contested in the election, which was conducted with all postal voting in common with councils across 4 of the English regions.

Election result
The results saw the Labour party remain the largest party on the council with 27 seats but with the Liberal Democrats gaining 2 seats to hold 24 after the election. As a result, the council remained hung with no party having a majority on the council. The most high-profile result saw the United Kingdom Independence Party win their first local council seat after John Cornforth defeated the independent councillor, John Considine, in Derringham ward by 7 votes after 6 recounts. However the independents immediately said that they would mount a legal challenge to the result.

Legal challenge
The independent candidate in Derringham said he would make a legal challenge to the result as the Returning Officer had said 3,540 ballot papers had been returned but that when the results were declared 140 ballot papers were missing. The independents claimed that these missing papers had ended up in counting rooms for other wards. They also said that people in Derringham had received ballots in the post that were intended for Marfleet ward and that no one knew how many people this had affected and were thus unable to vote.

The court challenge was successful with the High Court ruling that the result "may well have been affected". As a result, a new vote was ordered to be held, with the election set for 13 January 2005. The by-election was won by Michael Rouse-Deane of the Liberal Democrats who had come fourth in the original election in Derringham.

Ward results

No elections were held in Bransholme East, Bransholme West and University wards.

References

2004
2004 English local elections
2000s in Kingston upon Hull